Bokermannohyla saxicola is a species of frog in the family Hylidae.
It is endemic to Brazil.
Its natural habitats are moist savanna, subtropical or tropical moist shrubland, subtropical or tropical high-altitude shrubland, subtropical or tropical dry lowland grassland, rivers, and intermittent rivers.
It is threatened by habitat loss.

References

saxicola
Endemic fauna of Brazil
Amphibians described in 1964
Taxonomy articles created by Polbot